The Hassi R'Mel integrated solar combined cycle power station is an integrated solar combined cycle (ISCC) power station near Hassi R'Mel in Algeria. The plant combines a 25 MW parabolic trough concentrating solar power array, covering an area of over 180,000 m2, in conjunction with a 130 MW combined cycle gas turbine plant, so cutting carbon emissions compared to a traditional power station.  The output from the solar array is used in the steam turbine.

The construction contract was signed on January 5, 2007 and the plant was developed by New Energy Algeria (NEAL), a joint venture between Sonatrach, Sonelgaz, and SIM.

The station began producing electricity in June 2011. It was inaugurated July 14, 2011.

See also

List of solar thermal power stations
Solar thermal energy
SolarPACES
Yazd solar thermal power plant
Solar power in Algeria

References

External links
Hassi R'mel: Parabolic trough integrated with a combined cycle plant in Algeria
CSP Project Developments in Algeria
Natural Gas and Algerian Strategy for Renewable Energy
 Assessment of the World Bank/GEF Strategy for the Market Development of Concentrating Solar Thermal Power

Solar power stations in Algeria
Natural gas-fired power stations in Algeria